Bulldog Pluck is a 1927 American silent Western film directed by Jack Nelson and starring Bob Custer, Viora Daniel and Richard Neill.

Cast
 Bob Custer as Bob Hardwick
 Viora Daniel as Jess Haviland
 Bobby Nelson as Danny Haviland
 Richard Neill as Destin 
 Walter Maly as Gillen
 Victor Metzetti as Curley Le Baste
 Hugh Saxon as Pa Haviland

References

Bibliography
 Connelly, Robert B. The Silents: Silent Feature Films, 1910-36, Volume 40, Issue 2. December Press, 1998.
 Munden, Kenneth White. The American Film Institute Catalog of Motion Pictures Produced in the United States, Part 1. University of California Press, 1997.

External links
 

1927 films
1927 Western (genre) films
1920s English-language films
American silent feature films
Silent American Western (genre) films
Films directed by Jack Nelson
American black-and-white films
Film Booking Offices of America films
1920s American films